Wenche Halvorsen Stensrud (born 1954) is a Norwegian handball player. She played 91 matches and scored more than 200 goals for the Norwegian national team between 1975 and 1984.  She participated at the 1982 World Women's Handball Championship, where the Norwegian team placed seventh.

Stensrud (then Halvorsen) was top scorer ("") in the Norwegian League in the 1982/83 season (153 goals) and the 1985/86 season (168 goals), playing for the club Skjeberg IF.

After her active career, Stensrud was member of the staff as video analyst for the Norwegian women's national handball team.

Personal life
Stensrud was born in Fredrikstad in 1954.

References

External links

1954 births
Living people
Sportspeople from Fredrikstad
Norwegian female handball players